Mount Pleasant General Hospital was a Union Civil War hospital in northwest Washington, D.C., which operated from March 28, 1862, to August 10, 1865.

Location
The hospital was located on Meridian hill, east of 14th Street NW, North of Stone General Hospital probably north of Prince's Mill Road (now Park Road NW).

It is unclear who owned the land. Two versions exist:
 The first version is that the land belonged to Samuel P. Brown who had purchased it the same year from William Selden. Selden was a Confederate sympathizer who had been forced to move back to his native Virginia when the Civil War started.
 The second version is that it belonged to Mr. Stone.

History
Mount Pleasant General Hospital was a purpose-built hospital built in the winter of 1861-1862. During construction the buildings were guarded day and night by 9 soldiers under the orders of General Sykes to prevent attempts of incendiarism. It was based on plans provided by P.B. Wight, Esq. of New York and built under the approval of the Sanitary Commission.

It covered about an acre and a half and contained ten wards along with a kitchen and an administration building two stories high on the south side, 80 feet long and connected to the back via a 275 feet long corridor to the wards (five on each side of it). A 27 feet wide yard was added between each building to introduce light and ventilation to the wards.

The wards were 87 feet long and 28 feet wide and had both gas and water. The surgical room will be at the end of the corridor on the north side. It was fitted with the necessary equipment found in hospitals at the time. The kitchen laundry and other supporting services were on the east side of the administration building.

In total, the whole structure was 380 feet long by 200 wide. All the buildings were constructed on piles and elevated 3 feet above the ground to limit the dampness from the soil.

Designed originally for 400 patients, the hospital had a total of 1,618 beds. On the Census of December 17, 1864, 898 beds were occupied. This number was possible with the addition of tents.

Pictures

See also

 Washington, D.C., in the American Civil War
 Medicine in the American Civil War
 Armory Square Hospital
 Finley Hospital
 Lincoln Hospital
 Harewood General Hospital

References

Mount Pleasant Hospitals
Military facilities in Washington, D.C.
Demolished buildings and structures in Washington, D.C.
Mount Pleasant (Washington, D.C.)
Washington, D.C., in the American Civil War